Rodrigo Hilbert Alberton (born 22 April 1980) is a Brazilian television presenter, actor, and former model.

Early life
Rodrigo was born in Orleans, Santa Catarina. He is of German and Italian descent.

Career 
Although he also used to think about majoring in Agronomy, Hilbert's dream was inheriting his grandfather's smithery, with whom he used to work. At age 18, Hilbert received an invitation from a modeling agency to be one of their models in Rio de Janeiro, causing him to abandon his plans and move cities.

As a model, he was one of the faces of Versace. In his first video audition, he got the role in the soap opera Desejos de Mulher, in 2002. He publicly stated that he did not do well in the role due to not having prepared himself to be an actor.

Then he studied interpretation for four years, acted in two movies  and had small roles in two more soap operas, in Da Cor do Pecado and Senhora do Destino. Later, he made a huge success when he portrayed Murilinho in América.

With some friends, he set up a theater company Elza Gomes and traveled throughout Brazil with the play Duelo.

In 2007 he took part in Dança dos Famosos, the Brazilian equivalent of Strictly Come Dancing, in the TV show Domingão do Faustão, when he surprised everyone and got a lot of compliments from expert reviewers of the TV show jury and he was the winner.

Personal life
In 2003 he began to date the presenter Fernanda Lima, ending with her at the end of that year. Soon after he had a relationship of a few months with the actress Juliana Paes.

Hilbert and Fernanda resumed dating in September 2004. At the end of 2007, the couple announced that they were expecting twins, João and Francisco, who were born on April 20, 2008. They have lived together in a cohabitation since 2006 and the couple legally married in 2020.

Filmography

Television

Film

Internet

References

External links

 
Rodrigo Hilbert Magazine
The Internet Fashion Database
Official website (in Portuguese)

1981 births
Living people
People from Santa Catarina (state)
Brazilian people of German descent
Brazilian people of Italian descent
Brazilian male models
Brazilian male film actors
Brazilian male television actors
Dancing with the Stars winners
21st-century Brazilian male actors